Cynthia Knott (born March 20, 1952, Newark, New Jersey, United States)  is a painter known for her horiztonally-oriented seascapes which recall the "multiforms" of  Mark Rothko and the later work of J.M.W. Turner.

Biography 

Cynthia Knott received her BA from the School of the Museum of Fine Arts, Boston in 1971. She went on to earn her BFA at the School of Visual Arts, New York in 1975 and her MFA at New York University in 1989. Prior to pursuing art, Knott attended Washington University in St. Louis, intending to study Marine Biology. Knott dropped out after a year after realizing she wanted to pursue her interest in drawing.
Knott's study of and later artistic fascination with the ocean also draws upon family history. Knott's great-grandfather was an Irish sea captain.  Her series, "Migration," refers to the Atlantic voyage made by her family from Ireland by boat.

Work 

Knott began her career as an artist as a color field painter, inspired by the work of Mark Rothko. Knott developed renewed interest in the landscape after visiting in upstate New York and revisiting work by the Hudson River School. She then began to take interest in artists who were inspired by the landscape around them, such as Turner, Constable, and Whistler. Similar to Rothko's famous multiform paintings, Knott's work consists of "horizontal bands of monochromatic colors."

Knott's other influences include the fluorescent work of Dan Flavin, the linear abstraction of Barnett Newman, the color field painter Helen Frankenthaler, the landscapes of Jane Wilson, Hokusai's The Great Wave off Kanagawa, and wave and ocean scenes of Winslow Homer. The shimmering quality of light often found in her seascapes has also drawn comparison to the 19th century American "sublime" movement, Luminism.

Knott has been called a “horizonologist” by her friend, poet Billy Collins. Much of Knott's work explores the tension and fluidity between sky and sea, expressed through her treatment of the horizon as observed through different times of the day and light-quality and different weather conditions. On her use of the horizon, Knott explains,

, she was represented by DC Moore Gallery, New York.

Process 

First, Knott primes the canvas with a layer of sizing. This tightens the linen surface. Knott builds up the surface by painting this sizing—typically rabbit skin glue—by back-and-forth brushstrokes. This creates texture which serves to enhance the play of light in her paintings.

Next, Knott prepares the linen surface to receive color with a layer of white gesso.

For the final step before beginning work on the overpainting, Knott adds the underpainting, using a coat of ground copper paint and then a layer of gold paint.

Knott vigorously paints and re-paints her work, a technique she discovered in a book on Albert Pinkham Ryder. For instance, at the end of a day of painting, Knott may scrape off her work with a palette knife, leaving "a skin of memory and process" that becomes a faint stain of the day's work. She refers to this re-working as a "process of memory." She uses encaustic, which is a thick combination of beeswax, linseed oil, and Damar varnish, and metallic pigments alongside more traditional use of gesso and oil paint to "push" an effect of luminosity.

Knott often paints her seascapes en plein air. She has said that "The only way you can really understand light is to look at it. You have to be out there and see those clouds going by."
Many of her paintings depict coastal views near her home, Springs, NY in the north of East Hampton (town), New York—including Cartwright Shoal in Gardiner's Bay. For nocturnal scenes, Knott has painted a local salt marsh, which has a luminescent glow.

Interest in poetry 

In the earlier years of her career, Knott also turned to poets who were inspired by nature and the landscape such as Wordsworth.
Knott is also inspired by the poetry of W.B. Yeats and Emily Dickinson.

Billy Collins 

Knott is additionally inspired by the poetry of Billy Collins, a close friend. Collins has gone out with her to paint en plein air and offer his advice. For instance, Collins has directly influenced her use of one-word, evocative titles after criticizing her title "Poet's Prayer" as non-sensical.

In turn, a few of Collins' poems are inspired by Knott's paintings.
A United States Poet Laureate, Collins dedicated a poem inspired by his experience gazing at her seascapes. His poem, "Paintings of the Sea (For Cynthia Knott)", was reproduced in conjunction with Knott's exhibition Gardiners Bay, May 8 to Jaune 14, 2002. Another poem, "Horizon," which was published in his 2005 poetry collection The Art of Drowning, is also inspired by her work.

Honors and awards

Solo exhibitions 

 2006  New Works by Cynthia Knott and David Geiser, The Fireplace Project, East Hampton, NY
 2005 Paintings of the Sea, DC Moore Gallery, NY
 2004 Lizan Tops Gallery, East Hampton, NY
 2003: David Klein Gallery, Birmingham, MI

Publications 

Ruehl, Mercedes. Cynthia Knott. New York: DC Moore Gallery, 1997.
Spring, Justin. Horizons: Cynthia Knott. New York: Midtown Payson Galleries, 1994.
De Nagy, Tibor. The Sea: Cynthia Knott. New York: Tibor De Nagy Gallery, 1992.

Notable articles 

Carmichael, Isabel. “An Alchemist Who Channels the Ineffable,” The East Hampton Star, August 18, 2011, illus. C1, C8
Brandeis, Magdalene. “The Sea and the Sky: Paintings by Cynthia Knott, Poems by Billy Collins,” The Southampton Review, vol. III No. 1, Spring 2009, illus pp. 19, 21, 23, 25, 27, 29.
Norwich, John. “Cynthia Knott Horizonologist,” Hampton Jitney Magazine, vol. 9, Spring 2004 pp. 12–15.
Goodman, Jonathan. "Anne Harris and Cynthia Knott at DC Moore." Art in America (February 2003): pp. 117–18.
Weil, Rex. "Heaven in Earth." ARTnews (March 1998): pp. 150–152.
Wolberg Weiss, Marion. "Honoring the Artist: Cynthia Knott." Dan's Papers (August 4, 1995): pp. 78–79.

References 

1952 births
20th-century American painters
21st-century American painters
Living people
Artists from Newark, New Jersey
People from Springs, New York
American women painters
20th-century American women artists
21st-century American women artists